The 9th Parliament of Upper Canada was opened 11 January 1825.  Elections in Upper Canada had been held in July 1824.  All sessions were held at York, Upper Canada.  This parliament was dissolved 24 June 1828.

The House of Assembly of the 9th Parliament of Upper Canada had four sessions 13 January 1825 to 25 March 1828:

Both the House of Assembly and the Parliament sat at York General Hospital.

See also
Legislative Council of Upper Canada
Executive Council of Upper Canada
Legislative Assembly of Upper Canada
Lieutenant Governors of Upper Canada, 1791-1841
Historical federal electoral districts of Canada
List of Ontario provincial electoral districts

References

Further reading 
Handbook of Upper Canadian Chronology, Frederick H. Armstrong, Toronto : Dundurn Press, 1985. 

09
1825 establishments in Upper Canada
1828 disestablishments in Upper Canada